Ian Slater is a former professional rugby league footballer who played in the 1980s.

Club career
Ian Slater made his début for Featherstone Rovers on Friday 9 March 1984.

Genealogical information
Ian Slater is the grandson of the rugby league footballer who played in the 1930s, 1940s and 1950s; Frank Hemingway.

References

Bradford Bulls players
Featherstone Rovers players
Huddersfield Giants players
Place of birth missing
Rugby league five-eighths
English rugby league players
Year of birth missing